Big Brother is a 2007 Indian Hindi vigilante action film directed by Guddu Dhanoa, which starred Sunny Deol and Priyanka Chopra in the lead roles. This film is loosely based on the Rajinikanth starrer Tamil film Baashha. This was supposed to be Priyanka Chopra's first release in 2002 but was delayed by almost 5 years.

Plot
Big Brother is a story set in modern India which revolves around a small middle-class family composed of Dev Sharma (Sunny Deol), his wife Aarti (Priyanka Chopra), his mother Sitadevi (Farida Jalal), brother Akash (Imran Khan) and sister Prachi. Although they lead a simple and peaceful lifestyle, an incident occurs that changes their lives forever. The family is left with no choice but to leave Delhi and move to Mumbai in disguise. They start life afresh, and all seems well until the ghosts of the past surface again. Things reach a point when Dev Sharma is prodded by his mother to take a course of action which not only avenges their plight but also takes on the cause of the aggrieved in the country as a whole. The movement so created gets the support of the women at large and the infirm who proudly proclaim him to be their Big Brother.

Cast 

Sunny Deol as Devdhar Sharma/Devhar Gandhi (dual role)
Priyanka Chopra as Aarti Sharma (née Gandhi)
Farida Jalal as Sitadevi Sharma
Imran Khan as Akash Sharma / Popo Face
Danny Denzongpa as Police Commissioner Kudeshswar Negi
Shernaz Patel as Indu Negi, Kudeshswar Negi wife
Nishikant Dixit as Inspector
Avtar Gill as Advocate Nathani
Suhasini Mulay as Prime Minister
Govind Namdeo as Manohar Shinde
Sayaji Shinde as Baburao Bhau Kamble
Shahbaz Khan as Rajji Pandey
Raju Srivastava as Raju

Music 
The music of Big Brother is composed by Sandesh Shandilya and Anand Raj Anand.
 "Jag Lal Lal Lal" - Zubeen Garg
 "Jag Lal Lal Lal (version 3)" - Zubeen Garg, Ustad Sultan Kahn
 "Baalam Tera Nakhra" - Sunidhi Chauhan
 "Jag Lal Lal Lal (version 2)"- Ustad Sultan Khan
 "Jeevan Tumne Diya Hai" - Udit Narayan, Alka Yagnik, Roop Kumar Rathod, Sadhana Sargam
 "Piya" - Shreya Ghoshal, Kunal Ganjawala, Ustad Sultan Khan
 "Lak Tunu Tunu" - Anand Raj Anand, Jaspinder Narula

References

External links 
 

2000s Hindi-language films
2007 films
Films scored by Anand Raj Anand
Indian vigilante films
Indian action drama films
2000s action drama films
2007 crime drama films
Indian crime drama films
Vijayta Films films
2000s vigilante films
Films directed by Guddu Dhanoa